Manfred Orzessek (30 June 1933 – 12 April 2012) was a German football goalkeeper playing most of his career for FC Schalke 04 and Borussia Mönchengladbach.

He won the German championship with Schalke in 1958.

References

1933 births
2012 deaths
German footballers
Bundesliga players
FC Schalke 04 players
Borussia Mönchengladbach players
Sportspeople from Gelsenkirchen
Association football goalkeepers
Footballers from North Rhine-Westphalia
West German footballers
Germany under-21 international footballers